The Piper PA-32 Cherokee Six is a series of single-engine, fixed landing gear, light aircraft manufactured in the United States by Piper Aircraft between 1965 and 2007.

The PA-32 is used around the world for private transportation, air taxi services, bush support, and medevac flights.

Development
The PA-32 series was developed to meet a requirement for a larger aircraft than the four-seat Piper PA-28 Cherokee. The first prototype PA-32 made its initial flight on December 6 1963, with the type being publicly announced in October 1964, with Federal Aviation Administration (FAA) type certification following on March 4, 1965. The first production aircraft was the  PA32-260 Cherokee Six, a significantly modified six-seat (or seven-seat) development of the PA-28 Cherokee.

The Cherokee Six and its successors feature a baggage compartment in the nose between the cockpit and the engine compartment and a large double door in the back for easy loading of passengers and cargo.

PA-32-300
On 27 May 1966, Piper obtained FAA type certification for a  version, designated as the PA-32-300. It was offered by the company as a 1967 model.

PA-32R

The 1975 addition of retractable landing gear resulted in the first of the PA-32R series, the Piper Lance. This was the earliest aircraft in the Piper Saratoga family, Piper's luxury, high-performance single line.

Piper's transition to tapered wings for the Cherokee series resulted in a new wing for the PA-32 series, as well. The tapered-wing version of the Cherokee Six was named the Saratoga and debuted in 1980.

Piper 6X
After the General Aviation Revitalization Act of 1994, production of the retractable-gear Saratoga resumed in 1995. A fixed-gear PA32 was reintroduced in 2003 as the Piper 6X and the turbocharged 6XT. Sales of the 6X and 6XT models did not meet expectations and production ceased in late 2007.

PA-34 prototype

Piper built a prototype PA32-260 with IO-360 engines mounted on the wings. The trimotor aircraft was the proof-of-concept aircraft for the twin-engined, retractable-gear version of the Cherokee Six, the PA-34 Seneca.

Variants
PA-32-250 Cherokee Six
Prototype with 250hp Lycoming O-540 engine, two built

Production variant with a 260hp Lycoming O-540-E4B5 engine
PA-32-260 Cherokee Six B
1969 model with increased cabin space
PA-32-260 Cherokee Six C
1970 model with minor changes
PA-32-260 Cherokee Six D
1971 model with minor changes
PA-32-260 Cherokee Six E
1972 model with interior and instrument panel changes (note model letters not used after 1972)
PA-32-300 Cherokee Six
Variant with a 300hp Lycoming IO-540-K1A5 engine, named the Piper Six 300 after 1979
PA-32-300 Cherokee Six B
1969 model with instrument panel changes, engine changed to IO-540-K1G5
PA-32-300 Cherokee Six C
1970 model
PA-32-300 Cherokee Six D
1971 model
PA-32-300 Cherokee Six E
1972 model (note model letters not used after 1972)
PA-32-300LD
Experimental low-drag variant for increased fuel efficiency, one built
PA-32S-300 Seaplane Version
Factory built on floats, only a small number were made.

Variant from 1980 with a 300hp Lycoming IO-540-K1G5 engine
PA-32-301T Turbo Saratoga
Saratoga with a turbocharged Lycoming TIO-540-S1AD engine and revised cowling
PA-32-3M
PA-32 prototype modified as a three-engined aircraft with two 115-hp Lycoming O-235 engines fitted to the wings, for development of the PA-34 Seneca
Embraer EMB-720C Minuano
Brazilian license-built version of PA-32-300 Cherokee Six.
Embraer EMB-720D Minuano
Brazilian license-built version of PA-32-301 Saratoga Fixed Gear version. Production by Embraer and its subsidiary Indústria Aeronáutica Neiva.
Embraer EMB-721C Sertanejo
Brazilian license-built version of PA-32R-301 Lance.
Embraer EMB-721D Sertanejo
Brazilian license-built version of PA-32R-301 Saratoga Retractable Gear version.  Production by Embraer and its subsidiary Neiva.

Specifications (1972 model PA-32-300)

References

External links

 Piper Aircraft
 PA-32 series at Airliners.net

Low-wing aircraft
Single-engined tractor aircraft
1960s United States civil utility aircraft
PA-32
Aircraft first flown in 1963